Bonito Generation is the debut studio album by British indie pop band Kero Kero Bonito. A follow-up to the 2014 mixtape, Intro Bonito, this album was released via Double Denim Records on 21 October 2016. Bonito Generation produced six singles: "Picture This", "Lipslap", "Break", "Graduation", "Trampoline", and "Fish Bowl" (the song "Forever Summer Holiday", initially released as its own single in 2017, was later included as a bonus track on the Japanese edition of the album). Music videos were created for "Lipslap", "Break", and "Trampoline".

Background
Following the release of their debut mixtape Intro Bonito in 2014, Kero Kero Bonito made plans to write an album with producers affiliated with the record label PC Music that was "a bit more songwriter-y, rather than just disjointed basslines and riffs." A record was planned for release in 2015, but in October of that year they disclosed to Stereogum journalist James Rettig that they were still "figuring out what kind of statement they wanted to make" with their first studio album. Bonito Generation was completed at the beginning of August 2016, having been in the works for over a year.

Composition
Bonito Generation has been described to be an electropop, J-pop, and synth-pop record, with influences from electro, dancehall, video game music, 90s dance, hip hop, and K-pop. It has also been compared to the hyperpop sounds of PC Music and Sophie. Themes of the record also touch upon Instagram, hearing a catchy song on the radio, trampolines, waking up, childlike perspective upon day-to-day existential crises, and the curiosity of youth.

Bonito Generation was re-released on vinyl by Polyvinyl Record Co. on 11 January 2019.

Critical reception

Bonito Generation received widespread acclaim upon its release. Based on seven reviews, the aggregates review website Metacritic awarded Bonito Generation an 81 out of 100 rating, indicating "universal acclaim".

Reviewing the album for AllMusic, Heather Phares wrote, "Packed with breezy, witty, should-be hits, Bonito Generation is a winning mix of subversive art and genuine heart." Joe Rivers of Clash stated, "The production is disarmingly joyous and, thanks to a predilection for early '90s dance, some of the tracks here are absolute bangers." Jamie Milton of DIY magazine opined that the band had "perfected the quick fix formula" with the album, which included "a dozen giant would-be singles". While Milton wrote that the album "crams together a bunch of massive singles, melted into a sometimes grating dose of glucose," the review concluded that "that's the compromise for penning twelve monster hits." Milton also complimented the band for not "taking the piss" with the album and instead earnestly embracing their act.

Kate Hutchinson of The Guardian wrote that "Their no-fat nuggets have the hyper-slickness of kawaii J-pop, while harking back to an era (the 90s, obv) when high-concept chart hits were as ubiquitous as boy bands' curtains". However, she noted, "Their songs are best when they stop being so satirically cutesy and zip somewhere else."

Track listing

Credits adapted from ACE Repertory.

Charts

References

External links
 

2016 debut albums
Electropop albums
Kero Kero Bonito albums
Japanese-language albums